Leopold David Galland (born March 7, 1943) is a New York-based internist and author who specializes in undiagnosed or difficult-to-treat illnesses. His practice combines conventional and alternative therapies. Within the field of functional medicine he is known for developing the concept of "patient-centered diagnosis", for which he was awarded the Linus Pauling Award by the Institute for Functional Medicine in 2000.

His research includes nutrition, chronic allergies, leaky-gut syndrome, and Lyme disease. He is the author of several medical books including Superimmunity for Kids (1989), The Four Pillars of Healing (1997), Power Healing (1998), The Fat Resistance Diet (2006) and The Allergy Solution.

References

External links
 

1943 births
20th-century American physicians
American columnists
American medical writers
Harvard University alumni
American internists
Living people
Physicians from New York City
New York University Grossman School of Medicine alumni
University of Connecticut faculty
New York University staff
Rockefeller University faculty
State University of New York people
Writers from New York City